The 1992 Pacific Cup was the sixth edition of the Pacific Cup, a rugby league tournament held between Pacific teams. The tournament was hosted by New Zealand and eventually won by Western Samoa, who defeated Tonga 18–14 in the final, after double extra time.

Squads
The Australian Aboriginal side included Darrell Trindall, Paul Davis, Wayne Alberts, George Longbottom and Will Robinson.
American Samoa replaced Papua New Guinea at late notice. They included Hitro Okesene and his brother Paul.
The Cook Islands included Denvour Johnston.
Fiji included James Pickering.
The New Zealand Māori squad consisted of Peter Edwards, Richie Barnett, Whetu Taewa, Ruben Wiki, Jason Kaulima, David Ewe, David Bailey, Dean Clark, Ken McIntosh, Daryl Beazley, Mark Chambers, John Lomax, Syd Eru, Tukere Barlow, captain Mark Woods and Jason Mackie. Quentin Pongia was unavailable.
Tonga included Esau Mann, Jimmy Veikoso, Willie Wolfgramm and Franklin Fonua.
Western Samoa included Mike Setefano, Bryan Laumatia, Tony Tatupu and Paki, Paddy and Tony Tuimavave.
Norfolk Island - Shaun Goudie (c), Matthew Reeves (vc), Terry Jope, Brendan Christian, Brett Skinner, Brendon Cook, Jason Richards, Dylan Menzies, Peter Yager, Jeff Singer, Micky Saunders, Darren Nicolai, George Nabeaur, Kerry Nicholson, Shane Schmitz, Ian Kienan, Paul Dodds, Darren Trickey, Hayden Evans, Brendan King, Brian Buffett, Edan Mackie, Niel Christian and Brad Jones. Mal Snell (coach), Paul Christian (liaison office) and John Moochie Christian (first aid).

Tournament team
The Tournament team was: Paki Tuimavave (Samoa), Richie Barnett (Māori), Darrell Trindall (Aboriginies), Jimmy Veikoso (Tonga), Sanisuni Wabi (Fiji), Darryl Beazley (Māori), John Lomax (Māori), Fred Sapata (Samoa), James Pickering (Fiji), Wayne Alberts (Aboriginies), Tony Tatupu (Samoa), Tony Tuimavave (Samoa). Bench: Will Robinson (Aboriginies), Paddy Tuimavave (Samoa), Dave Schaumkell (Tonga) and Jason Mackie (Māori).

Results

Section 1

Section 2

An opening ceremony was held at Carlaw Park before the New Zealand Māori v Australian Aborigines match.

Finals

Semi-finals

Third place playoff

Final
The six teams that did not make the semi-finals played in a Nines tournament at Jack Colvin Park on 29 October. The final was played as a curtain raiser to the Pacific Cup final and won by Tokelau who defeated Fiji. Tonga was captained by loose forward Mark Roiall

The match went into triple overtime after Tonga had led 12-4 after 55 minutes.

References

Pacific Cup
1992
Pacific Cup
Pacific Cup